Sarnoff Mountains is a range of mountains, 25 nautical miles (46 km) long and 4 to 8 nautical miles (15 km) wide separating the west-flowing Boyd and Arthur Glaciers in the Ford Ranges of Marie Byrd Land. Walgreen Peak forms the northwest extremity of the range.

The west end of the range was discovered and roughly plotted from photos taken by Byrd Antarctic Expedition (1928–30) on the flight of December 5, 1929. The range was mapped in greater detail by the Byrd Antarctic Expedition (1933–35) and United States Antarctic Service (USAS) (1939–41), all expeditions led by R. Admiral Richard E. Byrd. Named for David Sarnoff, president of RCA (Radio Corporation of America), who provided radio equipment for receiving and transmitting that was used in the field and at Little America by the Byrd Antarctic Expedition (1933–35).

See also
List of mountains of East Antarctica
Mount Stagnaro

References

Ford Ranges